Looser is the surname of the following notable people:
 Devoney Looser (born 1967), American literary critic 
 Gualterio Looser (1898–1982), Chilean botanist and engineer
Hubert Looser (born 1938), Swiss businessman, philanthropist and art collector
Vera Looser (born 1993), Namibian road cyclist and mountain biker

See also 
 Loser (disambiguation)
 Loose (disambiguation)
 Loss (disambiguation)